Boniface II might refer to:
 Pope Boniface II (d. 532)
 Boniface II, Margrave of Tuscany (d. c. 838)
 Boniface II, Marquess of Montferrat (d. 1253)